.jobs is a sponsored top-level domain (sTLD) in the Domain Name System of the Internet. As indicated by its name, the domain is restricted to employment-related sites.

The domain was approved by ICANN on April 8, 2005, as part of the second group of new TLD applications submitted in 2004. It was installed in the DNS root in September 2005, and began accepting registrations later in the year.

Intended use
The intended use of the domain  is for companies and organizations to register some version of their corporate names and use it for a site aimed at those seeking employment with that company, or, .jobs can target a specific market. For example, manufacturing.jobs could represent employment for a specific corporation, or market sector.

In 2010, Employ Media LLC applied to ICANN to extend the charter under which Employ Media is authorized to sell the  domains. If accepted, Employ Media plans to create hundreds of thousands and perhaps a million new, niche job boards and sell domains such as Chicago.jobs to third parties. The International Association of Employment Web Sites and dozens of other employment services organizations have objected.

It has been suggested that subdomains of other domains, such as jobs.example.com, can be used without any new registrations on the part of the companies involved.  However, there is no general consensus among companies or industry sectors for any such naming scheme, like there is for the www prefix and other prefixes, so the proponents of  argue the domain can gain a market presence by allowing recruiters to communicate a simple, direct URL destination of employment opportunities to job seekers.

In 2013, Employ Media partnered with Cnjobs Technology which is headed by Dr. Renjun Bao to expand to greater China.

References

External links
Participating Registrars
ICANN press release

Sponsored top-level domains
Business services companies established in 2005
Computer-related introductions in 2005
Employment websites

sv:Toppdomän#Generiska toppdomäner